Krzeczyn Mały  is a village in the administrative district of Gmina Lubin, within Lubin County, Lower Silesian Voivodeship, in south-western Poland. 

Prior to 1945 it belonged to Germany. The former German Junker (landed nobility) of the Harrach family left a Baroque palace which since 1997 is a property of Count Ghislain de Nicolay.

References

Villages in Lubin County